Wars of Bribery is a 1996 Hong Kong crime television series produced by TVB that aired on its channel TVB Jade from 10 June to 5 July 1996. This drama is also that final series that stars Aaron Kwok and Athena Chu filmed for the television station.

Plot
Yeung Tai-chi (Aaron Kwok), a newcomer investigator of the ICAC, is met with frequent failures, but he remains optimistic. Chiu Wing-yee (Athena Chu), also a new member of the ICAC, is so aggressive that she always challenges Chi. Police officer Yau Lok-sang (Ben Ng) gets to know Leung Siu-man (Esther Kwan), who is blind, by chance. He is attracted by her optimistic personality and the two become lovers. Though Chi and Yee quarrel often, they manage to discover various briberies and they eventually fall in love. In the course of investigation, Chi is forced to make decisions between love, friendship, family and justice, and has difficulty in facing the dilemma.

Cast
Aaron Kwok as Yeung Tai-chi (楊大志)
Athena Chu as Chiu Wing-yee (趙詠兒)
Ben Ng as Yau Lok-sang (游樂生)
Esther Kwan as Leung Siu-man (梁小敏)
Marco Ngai as Benny Cheung Wang-bun (鄭宏彬)
Bowie Wu as Yeung Wai-tong (楊偉棠)
Mimi Chu as Chan Oi-yuk (陳愛玉)
Strawberry Yeung as Jessica Ho (何恩平)
Felix Lok as Ko Chun-yip (高振業)
Ai Wai as Fung Po (馮波)
Chan On-ying as Lee Suet-ying (李雲英)
Deno Cheung as Ho Wing-tat (何永達)
Luk Hei-yeung as Wong Ka-hon (王家漢)
Wong Man-piu as Chan Wing-kwai (陳榮貴)
Lam Pui-kwan as Lam Mei-yee (林美儀)
Lee Chi-kei as Chan Wai (陳偉)
Sunny Tai as Cheng Ping (鄭平)
Shum Wai as Wong Ha-pak (王夏柏)
Wong Chun-ning as Pak's assistant
Cheng Shui-hiu as ICAC investigator
Tong Chun-ming as ICAC investigator
Shum Sing-ming as ICAC investigator
Wong Tai-wai as ICAC investigator
Lulu Kai as Air stewardess / Nurse
Ng Wai-san as Air stewardess / Nurse
Ling Hon as Chan Chat (陳七)
Lai Sau-ying as Granny Luk (六婆)
Tang Yu-chiu as Ming (阿明)
Wong Sun as Uncle Cat (貓叔)
Fung Shui-chun as Madam Cat (貓嫂)
Lam Ka-lai as Car owner
Shum Bo-sze as ICAC investigator
Lui Wing-yee as ICAC investigator
Hui Chuen-hing as Chu Sir (朱SIR)
Chuek Fan as ICAC investigator
Eric Li as ICAC investigator
Mak Ka-lun as Eric
Derek Kok as Yau Pei (優皮)
Jim Ping-hei as Paul
Sue Tam as Lai Sau-lin (黎秀蓮)
King Kong Lam as Leung Siu-wah (梁小華)
Lily Liew as Cheung Yuk-fung (張玉鳳)
Lee Hoi-sang as Leung Wing-choi (梁永財)
Daniel Kwok as Yau Pei's underling
Lo Kong as Yau Pei's underling
Tai Siu-man as Ng Ka-on (吳家安)
Man Kit-wan as Kuen (阿娟)
Ting Lik as Wing Jai (榮仔)
Suen Hing-kwai as Hong Pak (康伯)
Lau Kong as Lam Yiu-chung (林耀忠)
Michelle Fung as Ho Yim-kam (何艷琴)
Wong Siu-lung as CID
Pok Kwan as Mr. Chan (陳生)
English Tang as Kwan Wai-lam (關偉林)
Cheung Hon-pan as Teacher A
Chan Yin-hong as Teacher B
Ho Mei-ho as Teacher C
Yiu Chau-po as Teacher D
Wong Sing-seung as Hung Kei (鴻記)
Gregory Charles Rivers as Johnny
Yu Tin-wai as President Wong (王社長)
Ho Sam as Bank staff
Luk Yuen-fan as Airline staff
Isaac Ng as Fung (峰)
Jerry Koo as Leopard (金錢豹)
Lee Yiu-king as Crazy Piu (喪標)
Yau Piu as Leopard's underling
Lo Wai as Leopard's underling
Chu Lok-fai as Piu's underling
Cheung Chun-wah as Piu's underling
Suen Yan-ming as Johnny's underling
Marco Lo as Johnny's underling
Lau Wing-chun as CID
Cheung Kwok-keung as Lau Chi-leung (劉子良)
Andy Tai as Ma Wai-lam (馬偉林)
Ceci So as Ms. Chan (陳姑娘)
Chu Kit-yee as Judy
Ngo Yeuk-ching as Ying-ying (瑩瑩)
Siu Yuk-yin as Maggie
Law Pun-nang as Hospital department head
Ruco Chan as Sei (阿四)
Kong Hon as Poon Sai-cheung (潘世昌)
Kwok Tak-shun as Hui Yiu-kei (許耀基)
Fong Kit as Thomas Chow
Kitty Lau as Chan Mei-wai (陳美惠)
Ho Cheung-kwan as Doggie Chiu (狗仔超)
Au Ngok as Poon household maid
Chan Chung-kin as Worker
Lui Kim-kwong as Worker
Zuki Lee as Saleswoman
Leung Chiu-ho as Repairman

See also
Aaron Kwok filmography

External links
Official website

TVB dramas
Hong Kong television shows
Hong Kong crime television series
1996 Hong Kong television series debuts
1996 Hong Kong television series endings
1990s Hong Kong television series